Sam Gleaves was an English football manager, noted for being the secretary of Burslem Port Vale for nine years at the turn of the 20th century, from 1896 until May 1905. During his time at the club, Vale won re-election from the Midland Football League into the Football League Second Division in 1898–99, reached the Birmingham Senior Cup final in 1899 and 1900 and the Staffordshire Senior Cup final in 1900, and won the Staffordshire Senior Charity Cup in 1897.

Managerial statistics
Source:

References

Year of birth missing
Year of death missing
English football managers
Port Vale F.C. managers
English Football League managers